Scriven is a surname, and may refer to:

 Aubrey Scriven (1904–1988) English professional footballer. 
 Augustine Scriven (1852–1916) Anglican priest.
 Charles Scriven (born 1945) Seventh-day Adventist theologian.
 Dominic Scriven (born 1963) British investor.
 Edward Scriven (1775–1841) English engraver.
 George P. Scriven (1854–1940) Brigadier General and seventh Chief Signal Officer of the United States Army. 
 Henry William Scriven (born 1951) English Anglican bishop.
 Herbert Richard "Bert" Scriven (1908–2001) English professional footballer.
 Joseph M. Scriven (1819–1886) Irish poet.
 Lawrence L. E. Scriven (1931-2007) American Professor of Chemical Engineering
 Margaret Scriven (1912–2001) British tennis player.
 Mary Stenson Scriven (born 1962) United States federal judge. 
 Michael Scriven (born 1928) British-born polymath and academic.
 Paul Scriven  Baron Scriven (born 1966) British politician.
 Peter Scriven (1930–1998) Founding artistic director of the Marionette Theatre of Australia.
 Tim Scriven (born 1965) British cricket player.
 Thomas Scriven (Blessed) Roman Catholic martyr.

See also
 Scrivener
 Scrivens